(born 7 January 1972) is a Japanese former ski jumper.

Career
His debut World Cup performance was on 17 December 1988 in Sapporo. He won a silver medal in the team large hill at the 2003 FIS Nordic World Ski Championships in Val di Fiemme and had his individual finish of 10th in the individual large hill at those same championships. Higashi also competed in the FIS Ski Flying World Championships, finishing 5th in the 2004 team event and 15th in the 1998 individual event. He also had six individual victories at various hill sizes from 1992 to 2004.

World Cup

Standings

Wins

External links

1972 births
Living people
Japanese male ski jumpers
People from Hokkaido
FIS Nordic World Ski Championships medalists in ski jumping
Asian Games medalists in ski jumping
Ski jumpers at the 2003 Asian Winter Games
Asian Games silver medalists for Japan
Medalists at the 2003 Asian Winter Games